Raymond Couderc (born 16 September 1946 in Bordeaux) is a French politician, and a former member of the Senate of France, who represented the Department of Hérault.  He is a member of the Union for a Popular Movement, which is a part of the European People's Party.

He is the Mayor of Béziers and the President of the community of the agglomeration Béziers to the Mediterranean.  Before he was a senator, he was a député in the National Assembly, representing the 6th constituency of Hérault.

Conviction 
The administrative Court of appeal in Marseille condemned the city of Béziers for workplace harassment leading to 'altruistic suicide' in 2003 Jean-Michel Rieux, his wife and his two children. Raymond Couderc was Mayor of the city of Béziers in 2003. The new municipality has not appealed to the Conseil d'État.

References

External links
Page on the Senate website

1946 births
Living people
French Senators of the Fifth Republic
Union for a Popular Movement politicians
Senators of Hérault